This is a list of yearly Big 12 Conference football champions. Champions are determined in a head to head matchup in the Big 12 Championship Game held at the end of the regular season. The game was played each year since the conference's formation in 1996 until 2010 and returned during the 2017 season. From 1996 to 2010 the championship game pitted the Big 12 North Division champion against the South Division champion in a game held after the regular season was completed.

Between 2011 and 2016, the championship was earned in round-robin regular-season play among all conference members. Until 2014, the league did not employ tiebreaking procedures, such as head-to-head results, to determine a single champion, and thus it was not unusual for a season to end with "co-champions." However with the 2015 season, head-to-head results will decide if two teams finish tied.

From 2017 onward, the championship game features the two teams with the best conference records. The champion usually is invited to the Sugar Bowl unless selected to play in one of the national semifinals for the College Football Playoff. Co-champions are listed in alphabetical order. Co-champions are no longer possible as the Big 12 Conference has switched to using a Conference Championship game to determine the winner.

Champions by year

Bold indicates a national championship.

Championships by team

Italics indicate a shared title.
* indicates a school no longer competing in the Big 12.

Big 12 Championship Game

Since 2017, the championship game has determined the conference champion. The game features the two teams with the best conference records. From the inaugural championship game in 1996 to 2010 the championship game pitted the Big 12 North Division champion against the South Division champion in a game held after the regular season was completed. From 2011 to 2016, a round-robin would determine the champion.

Championships by head coach

Active coaches are in bold

References

Big Twelve
Champions